Favonius is a Palearctic genus of butterflies in the family Lycaenidae.

Species list
Subgenus Favonius
 Favonius cognatus (Staudinger, 1892) north-eastern China and Korea
 Favonius cognatus cognatus
 Favonius cognatus ackeryi (Fujioka, 1994)
 Favonius cognatus latifasciatus (Shirôzu & Hayashi, 1959) Japan
 Favonius jezoensis (Matsumura, 1915) Sakhalin, Kuriles, Japan (Hokkaido)
 Favonius jezoensis jezoensis
 Favonius jezoensis azumajamensis (Kanda, 1994)
 Favonius jezoensis daisenensis (Tanaka, 1941)
 Favonius jezoensis magnificans Murayama, 1953
 Favonius korshunovi (Dubatolov & Sergeev, 1982) northeastern China, Amur Oblast, Ussuri, Korea
 Favonius korshunovi korshunovi
 Favonius korshunovi macrocercus (Wakabayashi & Fukuda, 1985)
 Favonius korshunovi shinichiroi Fujioka, 2003
 Favonius leechi (Riley, 1939) Szechwan
 Favonius orientalis (Murray, 1875) Amur Oblast, Ussuri, Kunashir, north-eastern China, Korea, Japan
 Favonius orientalis orientalis
 Favonius orientalis shirozui Murayama, 1956
 Favonius orientalis schischkini Kurentzov, 1970
 Favonius taxila (Bremer, 1861) north-eastern and central China, Amur Oblast, Ussuri, Korea, Japan
 Favonius ultramarinus (Fixsen, 1887) north-eastern China, Korea and Japan
 Favonius ultramarinus ultramarinus Korea
 Favonius ultramarinus borealis (Murayama, 1953) Japan
 Favonius ultramarinus hayashii (Shirôzu, 1953) Japan
 Favonius ultramarinus okumotoi (Koiwaya, 1996)
 Favonius ultramarinus suffusa (Leech, 1894)
 Favonius unoi Fujioka, 2003
 Favonius watanabei Koiwaya, 2002 Myanmar
 Favonius yuasai Shirôzu, 1948 Japan
 Favonius yuasai coreensis Myrayama, 1963 South Korea
Subgenus Tasogare Sugiura, 1993
 Favonius saphirinus (Staudinger, 1887) northeastern China, Korea, Japan, Amur Oblast, Ussuri
Incertae sedis
 Favonius latimarginata Murayama, 1963 Japan
 Favonius leechina Lamas, 2008

Former species
 Favonius fujisanus Matsumura, 1910 is now Sibataniozephyrus fujisanus (Matsumura, 1910)
 Favonius quercus (Linnaeus, 1758) is now Neozephyrus quercus North Africa, Europe and Asia Minor
 Favonius quercus iberica (Staudinger, 1901) Morocco, Algeria, Spain
 Favonius quercus interjectus (Verity, 1919)
 Favonius quercus longicaudatus (Riley, 1921) Turkey, Azerbaijan, western Iran

References

 , 1994: Zephyrus (Thechlini butterflies) in the world (5). Genus Favonius. Butterflies (Teinopalpus) 7: 3-17.
 , 2003: Descriptions of new species and new subspecies belonging to Tribe Theclini from Myanmar, Vietnam and west China. Gekkan-Mushi 384: 2-10.
 , 2000. On the genus Favonius (s. str.) in the continental Ashia. Gekkan-Mushi, (348): 18-22.
  2009: Favonius koreanus, the twelfth species of the genus. Gekkan-Mushi, (461): 9-14.  [in Japanese] [not seen]
Beitrag zur systenatik der Theclinae im kaiserreich Japan unter besonderer berucksichtigung der sogenannten gattung Zephyrus (Lepidoptera: Lycaenidae). Nature Life (Kyungpook J. bio. Sci.) 15: 33-46, figs.
images representing Favonius  at Consortium for the Barcode of Life

Theclini
Lycaenidae genera